The A43 is a primary route in east Ulster. The road starts in Ballymena, goes north, to Martinstown, then crosses the Antrim Hills, and descends into Glenure. The A43 terminates along the coast by A2, in the small town of Glenure.

Towns on its route are;
 Ballymena (for M2, A26, A36, A42)
 Martinstown
 Glenariff (for A2)

References

Roads in Northern Ireland